Lily Stockman (born 1982) is an American painter who lives and works in Los Angeles and Yucca Valley, CA.

Life and work
Lily Stockman studied Visual and Environmental Studies at Harvard University, during which time she spent five months in Ulaanbaatar, Mongolia apprenticing in Buddhist thangka painting at the Union of Mongolian Artists. In 2011, Stockman moved to Jaipur, India to study pigment and Mughal miniature painting. Her time in India culminated with an exhibition at the Threshold Art Gallery in Delhi. Stockman taught undergraduate painting for two years and received her MFA in studio art from New York University, where she studied with painter Maureen Gallace.

Stockman's essays have been featured in Vogue Magazine, Monocle (UK magazine), and the Iceland Review. In 2019, Charles Moffett Gallery published Stockman's first monograph, Imaginary Gardens with foreword by artist and Paper Monument founder Roger White.

Stockman's work has been exhibited at Charles Moffett and Cheim & Read in New York, Almine Rech and Timothy Taylor in London, Massimo de Carlo in Milan and Paris, Jessica Silverman and Berggruen Gallery in San Francisco, Night Gallery, and Regen Projects and the Underground Museum in Los Angeles. Her work has been reviewed in The New York Times, The New Yorker, The Brooklyn Rail, Interview (magazine), The Paris Review, New York Magazine, Los Angeles Times, and Artnet among others.

Stockman's work is in the permanent collection of the Smithsonian's Hirshhorn Museum and Sculpture Garden in Washington, D.C. and the Orange County Museum of Art in Costa Mesa, CA

Selected exhibitions
 2023: To be Announced, Solo Exhibition, Massimo de Carlo, London (March 2023)
 2022: Tilting Chair, Solo Exhibition, Charles Moffett, New York
 2022: A Green Place, Solo Exhibition, Almine Rech, London
 2022: Shrubs, Group Exhibition, Night Gallery, Los Angeles
 2021: Better Weather: Lois Dodd, Kieran Brenton Hinton, Lily Stockman, Group Exhibition, TOA Presents, Minneapolis
 2021: Summer Show, Group Exhibition, Almine Rech, Aspen 
 2021: Platform, Group Exhibition, Platform / David Zwirner, New York
 2020: LA Views, Group Exhibition, Maki Gallery, Tokyo  
 2020: Seed, Stone, Mirror, Match, Solo Exhibition, Charles Moffett, New York  
 2020: Conversational Spirits, Group Exhibition, Jessica Silverman, San Francisco 
 2020: Dwelling is the Light, Group Exhibition, curated by Katy Hessel, Timothy Taylor, London 
 2019: By Women, For Tomorrow’s Women, Group Exhibition, curated by Agnes Gund and Oprah Winfrey, Sotheby’s, New York 
 2018: Loquats, Solo Exhibition, Charles Moffett, New York 
 2018: All Over the Moon, Group Exhibition, Cheim & Read, New York 
 2018: My Kid Can Do That, Group Exhibition, curated by Kyle DeWoody, The Underground Museum, Los Angeles 
 2017: Tomorrow's Man, curated by Jack Pierson, Regen Projects, Los Angeles 
 2016: Pollinator, Solo Exhibition, Gavlak, Los Angeles  
 2015: E.1027, Group Exhibition, Joe Sheftel Gallery, New York 
 2015: Plainly to Propound, Group Exhibition, Gavlak, Los Angeles 
 2014: Women, Solo Exhibition, Luis De Jesus, Los Angeles 
 2013: ULTRAVIOLET: 1913–2013, Solo Exhibition, 80WSE Gallery, New York

Permanent collections
Hirshhorn Museum and Sculpture Garden, Washington, D.C. (2020)

Awards
 2013 Derek Bok Teaching Award, Harvard University, Cambridge, MA
 2013 Samuel Eshborn Award, New York, NY
 2012 Martin Wong Foundation Scholarship, New York, NY
 2011 US-India Educational Foundation Artist's Grant, New Delhi, India
 2011 Winterline Centre for the Arts Exhibition Grant, Mussoorie, Uttarakhand, India
 2006 National Geographic Expeditions Council Youth Grant to Mongolia

References

External links
 lilystockman.com
 blockshoptextiles.com

Harvard University alumni
1982 births
Living people
American artists
American women artists
Steinhardt School of Culture, Education, and Human Development alumni
21st-century American women